Stephen Kaplan is an American businessman and co-founder of Oaktree Capital Management, minority owner of the NBA's Memphis Grizzlies, and co-owner of Welsh football club Swansea City.

Biography
Kaplan was born to a Jewish family. He graduated with a J.D. from New York University School of Law. He and Howard Marks, Bruce Karsh, Larry Keele, Richard Masson, and Sheldon Stone co-founded Oaktree Capital Management.

In 2012, Kaplan purchased a minority stake in the NBA's Memphis Grizzlies as part of a group led by Robert Pera along with Daniel E. Straus as a minority investor.

Kaplan became co-owner of English Premier League Welsh football club Swansea City alongside Jason Levien in July 2016. The club were relegated at the end of the 2017–18 season.

References

Year of birth missing (living people)
Living people
American financial company founders
Jewish American sportspeople
21st-century American Jews